Danil Mikhailovich Neplyuev (born 2 January 1998) is a Russian football player. He plays for FC Saturn Ramenskoye.

Club career
He made his debut in the Russian Professional Football League for FC Metallurg Lipetsk on 18 July 2018 in a game against FC Kvant Obninsk.

He made his Russian Football National League debut for FC Fakel Voronezh on 23 October 2019 in a game against FC Spartak-2 Moscow.

References

External links
 Profile by Russian Professional Football League

1998 births
Footballers from Voronezh
Living people
Russian footballers
Russia youth international footballers
Association football midfielders
Association football defenders
PFC CSKA Moscow players
FC Metallurg Lipetsk players
FC Fakel Voronezh players
FC Avangard Kursk players
FC Saturn Ramenskoye players
Russian First League players
Russian Second League players